Frederick Porter may refer to:

 F. W. Porter (Frederick William Porter, 1821–1901), British/Irish architect
 Frederic Hutchinson Porter (1890–1976), American architect
 Frederick Charles Porter (1832–1869), Australian miner and explorer

See also
 Fred L. Porter (1877–1938), American farmer and politician from New York